Kulim (Malaysia) Berhad is a Malaysian company. Through its subsidiaries, it engages in oil palm plantation, investment holding, and property investment businesses in Malaysia. The company also manufactures rubber-based products, oleochemicals, and esters; produces oil palm clones by plant tissue culture technology; and distributes tropical fruits, as well as engaging in crude palm oil processing. The Corporate Office of Kulim (Malaysia) Berhad is located at Johor, Malaysia.

It provides plantation management and consultancy services, assembles agricultural and mechanical equipment and researches and produces oil palm seeds. It also operates quick service restaurants. It has operations primarily in Malaysia and Indonesia. The company was incorporated in 1933 and is based in Johor Bahru, Malaysia. Kulim (Malaysia) Berhad is a subsidiary of Johor Corporation.

History
Kulim (Malaysia) Berhad traces its history back to 1933 when Kulim Rubber Plantations Ltd was incorporated in United Kingdom. Kulim was
later incorporated as a public limited company and was listed on Main Board of the Kuala Lumpur Stock Exchange (now known as the Main Market of Bursa Malaysia Securities Berhad) in 1975. In 1976, Johor Corporation became the major shareholder of Kulim. Over the years, Kulim has grown to become a diversified plantation company and continues to strengthen its position by securing new hectarages while developing and strengthening its intrapreneur ventures. At the end of 2013, Kulim once again made its way into Indonesia with acquisition of 74% equity in PT Wisesa Inspirasi Nusantara, a plantation holding company in Indonesia, holding rights over 40,645 hectares of potential oil palm land in Central Kalimantan. With the completion of this strategic acquisition, as at the time of writing, the Kulim Group’s direct and indirect landholding stands at over 91,000 hectares (excluding NBPOL which was held for sale as at 31 December 2014), spread across Malaysia and Indonesia. After having footholds in O&G related businesses in Malaysia, Kulim had on 10 December 2014, entered into a Conditional Subscription and Shares Purchase.

Agreement with the existing shareholders of PT Citra Sarana Energi (“PT CSE”) for acquisition of 60% equity interest in the Company. This will enable Kulim to expand its involvement in the O&G sector particularly in Indonesia, moving up the value chain into the upstream activities - exploration and
production.

Core Business

Plantation
Kulim has operations currently spanning over Malaysia (within State Johor and Pahang) and Indonesia (Sumatera Selatan).

Malaysia Palm Oil Plantations Estate & Mills
Palm Oil Estates and also manage some of Johor Corporation Estates and smallholder cooperation
 Ladang Ulu Tiram, Johor Bahru
 Ladang Sedenak, Kulai
 Ladang Rengam, Kluang
 Ladang Basir Ismail, Johor Bahru
 Ladang REM, Kota Tinggi
 Ladang Siang, Kota Tinggi
 Ladang Sungai Papan, Kota Tinggi
 Ladang Sindora, Kluang
 Ladang Sungai Tawing, Kluang
 Ladang Mutiara, Kluang,
 Ladang Sungai Sembrong, Kluang
 Ladang Tereh Utara, Kluang
 Ladang Tereh Selatan, Kluang
 Ladang Selai, Kluang
 Ladang Enggang, Kluang
 Ladang Labis Bahru, Segamat
 Ladang Pasir Panjang, Kota Tinggi
 Ladang Pasir Logok, Kota Tinggi
 Ladang Bukit Kelompok, Kota Tinggi
 Ladang Kuala Kabong, Kulai
 Ladang Bukit Payong, Kota Tinggi
 Ladang Asam Bubok, Batu Pahat
 Ladang Palong, Segamat
 Ladang Sepang Loi, Segamat
 Ladang Kemedak, Segamat
 Ladang Mungka, Segamat
 Ladang UMAC, Pahang

Palm Oil Mill
 Sindora Palm Oil Mill, Kluang
 Sedenak Palm Oil Mill, Kulai
 Tereh Palm Oil Mill, Kluang
 Palong Cocoa & Palm Oil Mill, Segamat
 Pasir Panjang Palm Oil Mill, Kota Tinggi

Pineapple
 Kulim Pineapple Farm, Ulu Tiram
 KPF Tanah Abang, Mersing (Join venture with other party)

Intrapreneur Venture
Established as one of Kulim’s principal growth thrust, Intrapreneur Ventures (“IV”) Division is involved in a diverse range of businesses including shipping and logistics, support operations for plantations, including agricultural machinery, oil palm nursery and mills maintenance, support operations for Oil and Gas (“O&G”) sector as well as IT-related services. These companies will be developed and nurtured, with the aim to subsequently transform into strategic business division of the Group. With Kulim’s foray into the O&G upstream activities in Indonesia, O&G support services, namely E.A. Technique (M) Berhad and Danamin (M) Sdn Bhd, will be reclassified under the Group’s new O&G business segment effective 1 January 2015

Subsidiaries
Some of the key subsidiaries are:-
 Sindora Berhad
 Mahamurni Plantations Sdn Bhd
 Kulim Plantations (Malaysia) Sdn Bhd
 Ulu Tiram Manufacturing Company (Malaysia) Sdn Bhd
 Kumpulan Bertam Plantations Berhad
 EPA Management Sdn Bhd
 Selai Sdn Bhd
 PT Wisesa Inspirasi Nusantara
 E.A.Technique (M) Berhad
 Extreme Edge Sdn Bhd
 Edaran Badang Sdn Bhd
 JTP Trading Sdn Bhd

See also
 List of companies of Malaysia

References

External links 
 
 Company Overview of Kulim (Malaysia) Berhad, bloomberg.com
 Kulim (Malaysia) Berhad (MYX: 2003), bursamalaysia.com

Agriculture companies of Malaysia
Conglomerate companies established in 1933
1933 establishments in British Malaya
Companies formerly listed on Bursa Malaysia
Government-owned companies of Malaysia
Privately held companies of Malaysia
Johor Corporation
Real estate companies established in 1933
Manufacturing companies established in 1933
Food and drink companies established in 1933